The Colfax Carnegie Library, also known as Colfax Public Library, is a historic Carnegie library located at Colfax, Clinton County, Indiana.  It was built in 1917, and is a -story, Classical Revival style brick building on a raised basement.  It features a red terra cotta style hipped roof and decorative frieze.  It was built in part with $9,000 provided by the Carnegie Foundation.

It was listed on the National Register of Historic Places in 1994. The historic Carnegie library remains in operation today as a public library; its name has been changed to "Colfax-Perry Township Public Library" to accurately represent its wider service area.

References

External links

Library website

Carnegie libraries in Indiana
Libraries on the National Register of Historic Places in Indiana
Library buildings completed in 1917
Neoclassical architecture in Indiana
Buildings and structures in Clinton County, Indiana
National Register of Historic Places in Clinton County, Indiana